Obrocz  is a village in the administrative district of Gmina Zwierzyniec, within Zamość County, Lublin Voivodeship, in eastern Poland.

References

Obrocz